Athletics competitions at the 2021 Junior Pan American Games in Cali, Colombia were scheduled to be held from November 30 – December 4, 2021.

Medal summary

Medal table

Medalists

Men

Women

Mixed

Participation

References

Athletics
Pan American Games
Qualification tournaments for the 2023 Pan American Games